John Charles Howorth Spence ForMemRS HonFRMS (21 April 1946 – 28 June 2021) was Richard Snell Professor of Physics at Arizona State University and Director of Science at the National Science Foundation BioXFEL Science and Technology Center.

Education
Spence was educated at the University of Melbourne where he was awarded a PhD in 1973 for work on double plasmon studies of metals under the supervision of Alan Spargo. He conducted postdoctoral research at University of Oxford under Sir Peter Hirsch, David Cockayne and Michael Whelan, and then at Arizona State University under John M. Cowley, working alongside Sumio Iijima, Ondrej Krivanek and David J. Smith. Later, he established his own group at Arizona State University.

Awards and honours
Spence was elected a Foreign Member of the Royal Society (ForMemRS) in 2015. His nomination reads: 

In 2017 he was made an Honorary Fellow of the Royal Microscopical Society (HonFRMS) for his contributions to microscopy. Spence was a (corresponding) Fellow of the Australian Academy of Science, and the author of the book "Lightspeed"  (OUP 2019) on the history of attempts to measure the speed of light leading to Einstein's theories. For 2021 he was awarded the Gregori Aminoff Prize. He died in 2021.

Bibliography

Monograph and handbook

Nonfiction

See also
 Henry N. Chapman
 Sumio Iijima
 Serial femtosecond crystallography

References

1946 births
2021 deaths
People from Canberra
Foreign Members of the Royal Society
Fellows of the Institute of Physics
Australian physicists
Australian Fellows of the Royal Society
Microscopists
Fellows of the Australian Academy of Science
Honorary fellows of the Royal Microscopical Society